The Department of Water and Sanitation is one of the departments of the South African government.  It is responsible for the state of water and sanitation in South Africa.

In May 2009, following the election of Jacob Zuma, the Department of Water Affairs and Forestry was divided, with the forestry responsibility being transferred to the Department of Agriculture, Forestry and Fisheries. The Department of Water and Sanitation was established in May 2014 by President Jacob Zuma with former Gauteng Premier Nomvula Mokonyane becoming the first Minister (26 May 2014 – 28 January 2018). She was replaced by Gugile Nkwinti.

Corruption and incapacitation 
The department has developed a reputation for fraud, corruption and procurement irregularities. The 2019/20 financial year report noted R10-billion had been squandered by the department, and the 2020-21 financial report has found another R10-billion in irregular expenditure. As a result of this widespread, large-scale and persistent financial ill-discipline, the department has stated it cannot fund necessary water infrastructure projects. A report by Corruption Watch and the Water Integrity Network in 2020 noted that corruption in the Department of Water and Sanitation exacerbates water shortages in South Africa, as are currently happening in the Eastern Cape.

Water security
In 2022 the department revealed that almost all municipalities had aging and dysfunctional water infrastructure. Poor maintenance and operations at local government level caused an average 40% (26%-60%) of water to be lost before it reached end users.

References

External links
Department of Water and Sanitation website

Water supply and sanitation in South Africa
Water
Water Affairs
South Africa
Ministries established in 1912
Water resource management in South Africa
Water in South Africa
1912 establishments in South Africa